Kazanpınar is a village in the Dinar District, Afyonkarahisar Province, Turkey. Its population is 89 (2021).

References

Villages in Dinar District